Jimmy O'Neal Hurst (born March 1, 1972) is a former professional baseball right fielder. He played for one season in Major League Baseball for the Detroit Tigers. He also played in Japan for the Hiroshima Toyo Carp in 2003.

Career
Hurst was drafted by the Chicago White Sox in the 12th round of the 1990 amateur draft. Hurst played his first professional season with their Rookie league GCL White Sox in 1991, and his last with the Fargo-Moorhead RedHawks of the independent Northern League in 2008. He played his last affiliated season in 1999 for the Toronto Blue Jays' Triple-A Syracuse Chiefs.

In 2002 while playing for the Newark Bears, Hurst was named Atlantic League MVP after hitting .341 with 100 RBI's, 35 Home Run's, and 150 hits.

References

External links

1972 births
Living people
Acereros de Monclova players
African-American baseball players
American expatriate baseball players in Canada
American expatriate baseball players in Japan
Atlantic City Surf players
Baseball players from Alabama
Birmingham Barons players
Fargo-Moorhead RedHawks players
Detroit Tigers players
Gulf Coast White Sox players
Hiroshima Toyo Carp players
Jacksonville Suns players
Major League Baseball right fielders
Nashua Pride players
Nashville Sounds players
New Haven County Cutters players
Newark Bears players
Nippon Professional Baseball outfielders
Pawtucket Red Sox players
Prince William Cannons players
Utica Blue Sox players
Schaumburg Flyers players
South Bend White Sox players
Syracuse SkyChiefs players
Three Rivers Raiders baseball players
Toledo Mud Hens players
Winnipeg Goldeyes players
American expatriate baseball players in Mexico